French Guiana is an overseas region of France, located on the northern coast of South America between Suriname and Brazil. The country is part of Caribbean South America and borders the North Atlantic Ocean. It has low-lying plains with small mountains to the south. Its climate is split between tropical rainforest and tropical monsoon. French Guiana is mostly unsettled and has low land use.

French Guiana is situated on the northeast coast of South America between 2° and 5° latitude north and covers an area of 35,135 square miles. It is separated from Surinam (Dutch Guiana) by the Maroni River and two of its tributaries, the Aoua and Itany, in the west, and from Brazil by the Tumuc Humac Mountains in the south and the Oyapock River in the east. Its 200-mile Atlantic coastline is bordered by several rocky islands – the Iles du Salut (Devil's Island, Royale and Saint-Joseph), the Père and Mère Islands, Malingre Island and Rémire Island, and the two Connétables—which are all part of French Guiana.

Statistics

Area 
Total: 91,000 km2
Land: 89,150 km2
Water: 1,850 km2

Land boundaries 
Total: 1,183 km
Border countries: Brazil 673 km, Suriname 510 km (disputed)
Coastline: 378 km

Maritime claims
Exclusive economic zone: 
territorial sea: .

Land use
Arable land: 0%
Other: 10% (1996 est.)
Irrigated land: 20 km2 (1993 est.)
Geography – note: mostly an unsettled wilderness.

Natural resources
Bauxite, timber, gold (widely scattered), cinnabar, kaolin, fish, shrimp, rice, bananas.

Climate
French Guiana's climate is tropical and hot with a Köppen climate classification of tropical rainforest (Af) throughout most of the country. Heavy showers, severe thunderstorms, and floodings are frequent, as is intense heat and humidity.

Although French Guiana is very close to the equator, the trade winds which blow almost the year round refresh the coastal region and prevent the formation of great tropical storms. The annual mean temperature on the coast is 80° Fahrenheit. There are two principal seasons: “summer" from July to December and the "rainy season” the rest of the year, broken only by a Short “March Summer.”

Terrain

French Guiana extends almost 250 miles into the continent and is divided into two natural zones: a small, low, swampy coastal area called the “Terres Basses,” varying from ten to thirty miles in width, and a granite peneplain called the "Terres Hautes," worn down by erosion into steps forming a series of low steep hills. Almost the entire country is covered by rain forest and its many large rivers and streams, although their courses are broken by rapids, constitute the only natural means of penetration into the interior. The main rivers, flowing in a general south-north direction, are the Maroni, the Mana, the Iracoubo, the Sinnamary, the Kourou, the Mahury, the Approuague and the Oyapock.

Extreme Points

 Northernmost point – Pointe Isère
 Southernmost point – border with Brazil, Maripasoula
 Westernmost point – disputed, see France–Suriname relations
 assuming France's claim: tripoint with Suriname and Brazil, Maripasoula
 assuming Suriname's claim: point on Maroni, Apatou
 Easternmost point – mouth of Oyapock, Saint-Georges commune (but near the village of Ouanary)
 Highest point – Bellevue de l'Inini: 851 m
 Lowest point – Atlantic Ocean: 0 m

See also 

 Geography of Suriname
 Guiana Shield

References